Santiago Grassi (born 25 September 1996) is an Argentine swimmer. He competed at the 2016 Summer Olympics in the men's 100 metre butterfly; his time of 52.56 seconds in the heats did not qualify him for the semifinals. He represented Argentina again at the 2020 Summer Olympics in the men's 100 metre butterfly event.

Career 
He won the silver medal in the men's 100 metre butterfly event at the 2015 Pan American Games.

References

1996 births
Living people
Argentine male swimmers
Olympic swimmers of Argentina
Swimmers at the 2016 Summer Olympics
Swimmers at the 2015 Pan American Games
Swimmers at the 2019 Pan American Games
Pan American Games silver medalists for Argentina
Swimmers at the 2014 Summer Youth Olympics
Pan American Games medalists in swimming
Medalists at the 2015 Pan American Games
Medalists at the 2019 Pan American Games
Swimmers at the 2020 Summer Olympics

Auburn Tigers swimming and diving
Sportspeople from Santa Fe, Argentina
21st-century Argentine people